Henry Peirse (1695 – 2 October 1759) of Bedale in Yorkshire was an English landowner and Member of Parliament.

He was born the eldest son of John Peirse of Lazenby, Yorkshire and inherited the manor of Bedale from his grandfather. In the 1730s he transformed the old manor house into a Palladian mansion, renaming it Bedale Hall.

He served as a Member of Parliament for Northallerton in Yorkshire between 1713 and 1715 and between 1722 and 1754.

He married Anne Johnson on 15 February 1754 and had one son, Henry, who was also MP for Northallerton for many years.

He was assassinated in Birkshire on 2 October 1759.

References

1695 births
1759 deaths
People from Bedale
Members of the Parliament of Great Britain for English constituencies
British MPs 1713–1715
British MPs 1722–1727
British MPs 1727–1734
British MPs 1734–1741
British MPs 1741–1747
British MPs 1747–1754